Happy Herowati born 1935,  is a former Indonesian badminton player who played in the 1960s.

Profile
Happy Herowati became one of the early generations of Indonesian women's badminton in the 1960s and won the women's team, silver medal in women's doubles and bronze in women's singles at the Badminton at the 1962 Asian Games. In the 1962 Asian Badminton Championships, together with Corry Kawilarang, won the women's doubles after defeating Thailand's women's doubles.

Achievements

Asian Games 

Women's doubles

Asian Championships 

Women's doubles

References 

1935 births
Living people
Asian Games medalists in badminton
Badminton players at the 1962 Asian Games
Asian Games gold medalists for Indonesia
Asian Games silver medalists for Indonesia
Asian Games bronze medalists for Indonesia
Medalists at the 1962 Asian Games
20th-century Indonesian women